is a Japanese politician of the Constitutional Democratic Party and a member of the House of Councillors in the Diet (national legislature). A native of Yokohama, Kanagawa and graduate of Yokohama National University, he was elected for the first time in 2004.

References

External links 
  in Japanese.

1957 births
Living people
Members of the House of Councillors (Japan)
People from Yokohama
Constitutional Democratic Party of Japan politicians
Democratic Party of Japan politicians
Yokohama National University alumni